The Jordan Shield Cup is a men's football (soccer) competition played in Jordan started in 1981. It was generally played before the start of the domestic league season.

Winners by year

Winners

Performance by club

External links
Jordan - List of Cup Winners, RSSSF.com
 Jordan Shield Cup - Hailoosport.com (Arabic)
 Jordan Shield Cup - Hailoosport.com

 
Shield Cup
Jordan
1981 establishments in Jordan